Helle for Helene is a 1959 Danish family film directed by Gabriel Axel and starring Birgitte Bruun.

Cast
Birgitte Bruun as Helene Thomsen
Poul Reichhardt as Tandlæge Rudolf Thomsen
Preben Mahrt as Mathisen (bartender)
Kjeld Petersen as Sindsygelæge Smith
Randi Michelsen as Helenes mor Fru Tekla
Hans W. Petersen as Holm
Agnes Rehni as Professor Piper
Ingeborg Skov as Prof. de Witt
Ellen Margrethe Stein as Prof. Hvam
Valdemar Skjerning as Professor Piper
Arne Weel as Prof. de Witt
Svend Bille as Prof. Hvam
Poul Thomsen as Albert (bartender)
Valsø Holm
Knud Schrøder
Henry Lohmann
Carl Ottosen
Knud Hallest
Jytte Abildstrøm
Bjørn Spiro

References

External links

Helle for Helene at the Danish National Filmography

1959 films
1950s Danish-language films
Danish black-and-white films
Films directed by Gabriel Axel
Films produced by Erik Balling